Silvio René Carrario (born August 31, 1971 in Bell Ville, Córdoba Province) is an Argentine football manager and former player.

Carrario first played for Central Córdoba before moving to Talleres de Córdoba in 1994. A season later he transferred to Racing Club for one season, played a few games for Boca Juniors in 1996, and half season for Unión de Santa Fe in 1997. That year, he played for Deportivo Español, and at the end of the 1997–98 season moved to Chacarita Juniors, where he played until 2002. The following season he played for Venezuelan Deportivo Italchaco.

Carrario returned to Argentina to play for Olimpo in the 2002–03 season. In 2003, he played a few games for Lanús, for Quilmes in 2004, Argentinos Juniors in 2005, and returned to Quilmes in 2006.

In 2006–07, Olimpo de Bahía Blanca of the Argentine where he won the Apertura 2006 and Clausura 2007 2nd Division titles to help Olimpo win promotion to the Argentine Primera División.

He then joined Club Atlético Aldosivi of the Primera B Nacional in 2007 and Bolivian club Bolívar in 2008.

His is often called Tweety Carrario, named after the Tweety Bird.

References

External links
 Silvio Carrario - Argentine Primera stats (since 2002) at Futbol XXI  
 Profile at La Voz del Interior newspaper 
 Silvio Carrario at BDFA.com.ar 

1971 births
Living people
Sportspeople from Córdoba Province, Argentina
Argentine footballers
Association football forwards
Talleres de Córdoba footballers
Racing Club de Avellaneda footballers
Boca Juniors footballers
Unión de Santa Fe footballers
Deportivo Español footballers
Chacarita Juniors footballers
Club Atlético Lanús footballers
Quilmes Atlético Club footballers
Argentinos Juniors footballers
Argentine expatriate sportspeople in Venezuela
Olimpo footballers
Deportivo Italia players
Aldosivi footballers
Central Córdoba de Rosario footballers
Club Bolívar players
Argentine Primera División players
Argentine expatriate footballers
Expatriate footballers in Bolivia
Argentine football managers
Central Córdoba de Rosario managers
Argentine expatriate sportspeople in Bolivia